Garnier is a mass market cosmetics brand of French cosmetics company L'Oréal. It produces hair care and skin care products.

Launch
Laboratoires Garnier was founded in France in 1904 by Alfred Amour Garnier. The company's first product was a patented as the first hair lotion derived from natural plant ingredients. The company then introduced sun-care products in 1936, followed by permanent home hair color in 1960.

Expansion and products 
Over the decades Garnier expanded from hair color and hair care into skincare since acquisition in 1970.

References

Shampoo brands
L'Oréal brands
French brands